Martin Karl Reidinger (born December 18, 1958) is the Chief United States district judge of the United States District Court for the Western District of North Carolina.

Education and career

Born in New Haven, Connecticut, Reidinger received a Bachelor of Arts degree from the University of North Carolina at Chapel Hill in 1981 and a Juris Doctor from the University of North Carolina School of Law in 1984. He was in private practice in Asheville from 1984 to 2007.

Federal judicial service

On January 9, 2007, Reidinger was nominated by President George W. Bush to a seat on the United States District Court for the Western District of North Carolina vacated by Graham Calder Mullen. Reidinger was confirmed by the United States Senate on September 10, 2007, and received his commission on September 12, 2007. He became Chief Judge on June 2, 2020.

Personal life
Reidinger lives in Asheville, North Carolina. He is married and has three daughters and a son.

Sources

1958 births
Living people
Judges of the United States District Court for the Western District of North Carolina
North Carolina lawyers
Lawyers from New Haven, Connecticut
United States district court judges appointed by George W. Bush
21st-century American judges
University of North Carolina at Chapel Hill alumni
University of North Carolina School of Law alumni